Fire Safety Journal is a peer-reviewed scientific journal dealing with original and multidisciplinary research on all aspects of the science and engineering of fire, fire safety and fire protection. Topics include but are not limited to chemistry and physics of fire, fire dynamics, explosions, fire protection systems, detection, suppression, structural response, structural protection, fire investigations, design (including consumer products, industrial plant, transportation, buildings), people/fire interactions (physical, physiological, and psychological), risk, management, legislation, and education. It is the official journal of the International Association for Fire Safety Science and is published by Elsevier.

Abstracting and indexing 
The journal is abstracted and indexed in Cambridge Scientific Abstracts, Chemical Abstracts, Compendex, Current Contents/Engineering, Engineered Materials Abstracts, Engineering Index, Fire Technology Abstracts, Materials Science Citation Index, PASCAL, Science Citation Index, and Scopus. According to the Journal Citation Reports, its 2020 impact factor is 2.764.

References

External links 
 
 The International Association for Fire Safety Science

English-language journals
Fire protection
Fire prevention
Wildfire suppression
Occupational safety and health journals
Engineering journals
Elsevier academic journals
Publications established in 1977